IBRO Neuroscience Reports (formerly known as IBRO Reports) is a peer-reviewed open-access scientific journal covering neuroscience. It was established in 2016 and is published by Elsevier on behalf of the International Brain Research Organization (IBRO). It is the sister journal of IBRO's main journal, Neuroscience. The editor-in-chief is Y.S. Chan (The University of Hong Kong). The journal is abstracted and indexed in Scopus, and PubMed Central.

References

Neuroscience journals